A biographical dictionary is a type of encyclopedic dictionary limited to biographical information. Many attempt to cover the major personalities of a country (with limitations, such as living persons only, in Who's Who, or deceased people only, in the Dictionary of National Biography). Others are specialized, in that they cover important names in a subject field, such as architecture or engineering.

History in the Islamic civilization
Tarif Khalidi claimed the genre of biographical dictionaries is a "unique product of  Arab Muslim culture". 

The earliest extant example of the biographical dictionary dates from 9th-century Iraq, and by the 16th-century it was a firmly established and well-respected form of historical writing. They contain more social data for a large segment of the population than that found in any other pre-industrial society. The earliest biographical dictionaries initially focused on the lives of the prophets of Islam and their companions, with one of the earliest examples being The Book of The Major Classes by Ibn Sa'd al-Baghdadi, and then began documenting the lives of many other historical figures (from rulers to scholars) who lived in the medieval Islamic world. The largest known biographical dictionary ever produced is called History of Damascus authored by a Muslim historian Ibn Asakir.

When it comes to the numbers of individuals, American scholar of Islam Richard Bulliet argues that "a brief look at Brockelmann's Geschichte der Arabischen Litteratur is sufficient to convince  anyone  that the number of individual  biographies  extant must run into the hundreds of thousands and most  likely  into the millions."

See also
List of biographical dictionaries

References

Citations

Sources 

"Biographical dictionaries" University of Illinois at Urbana-Champaign.
"Biographical dictionaries" Khabari Club Biography Topics.

 
Encyclopedias
Arabic literature